Alexander Kwamina Afenyo-Markin (born 27 May 1978) is the Member of the Parliament of Ghana for the Effutu constituency, Central Region. He also serves as a member of the committee on Defense and Interior Committee in Ghana Parliament. He is currently the Deputy Majority Leader in the Parliament of Ghana.

Early life and education 
He studied law at the University of Buckingham, (LLB/mgt, 2003–2006), Ghana School of Law where he received a Barrister at Law certification (2007-2009), and received an M.A in international politics and security studies at the University of Bradford (2009-2010).

Career 
Between the year 1999 and 2003, the Effutu legislator worked as a Principal Postal Officer at the Ghana Post Company Limited. Also, he worked at the Excel Courier Ghana Limited as the Director between 2004 and 2011 and an Associate at Dehenya Chambers from 2010 to 2016.

Politics 
In 2012, on the ticket of the NPP, Afenyo-Markin contested the NDC parliamentary candidate, Mike Allen Hammah and won.

He became the chairman of Ghana Water Company Ltd (GWCL) in 2017. He was alleged to have been involved in the near collapse of GWCL and other financial improprieties, over which he launched an defamation lawsuit in the court. He has been on the Committee of Defense and the Interior Finance Committee in Ghana Parliament

In 2021, Afenyo-Markin together with Abdul-Aziz Ayaba Musah, Johnson Kwaku Adu, Laadi Ayii Ayamba and Emmanuel Kwasi Bedzrah were sworn in during the Extraordinary Session 2021 of the Parliament of the ECOWAS which happened in Freetown in Sierra Leone.

Projects/Initiatives

One Teacher, One Laptop 
The One Teacher, One Laptop initiative was launched on 13 October 2018, during the donation of 100 laptops to teachers within the Effutuman at the Ebenezer Methodist Church in Winneba.

In January, 2021, 40 newly posted teachers received laptops to enhance teaching and learning.  Through this initiative about 1000 laptops have been donated to teachers of both private and public schools in the constituency.

The Effutu Dream 
The Effutu Dream was initiated in February 2020 to promote the Effutuman culture which will create a sense of belonging among the youth in its constituency. This also focused on capacity building of its constituents. The dream aimed at branding Effutu Constituency to attract tourists and investors.

This initiative was birthed at a conference under a theme "Actualizing the Effutu Dream; the role of Effutu youth".

14 Libraries Project 
As part of delivering quality education in the constituency, 14 libraries have been constructed to enable a reading culture among young people. A total of 14 libraries have been constructed under this initiative.

Royal Palm Tree Project 
On 7 March 2020, Afenyo-Markin planted Royal Palm trees in the Winneba capital.

Personal life 
Afenyo-Markin is married to Dianne Markin and they have kids. He plays table tennis and golf. He is a member of the fraternal society called Freemason.

References

External links
Parliament of Ghana biography
Ghana Water Company

Living people
1978 births
Ghanaian Freemasons
21st-century Ghanaian lawyers
Alumni of the University of Bradford
Alumni of the University of Buckingham
Ghanaian MPs 2013–2017
People from Central Region (Ghana)
Ghanaian MPs 2021–2025